Juan Valentin Furagganan Ponce Enrile Sr.,  (born Juanito Furagganan; February 14, 1924), also referred to by his initials JPE, is a Filipino politician and lawyer known for his role in the administration of Philippine president Ferdinand Marcos; his role in the failed coup that helped hasten the 1986 People Power Revolution and the ouster of Marcos; and his tenure in the Philippine legislature in the years after the revolution. In 2022, at the age of 98, he returned to government office as the Chief Presidential Legal Counsel in the administration of Bongbong Marcos.

Enrile was a protégé of President Ferdinand Marcos who served as Justice Secretary and Defense Minister during the Marcos administration. Enrile played a key role in the planning and documentary legwork for Martial Law, and was in charge of the Philippine Military during its implementation. Other roles in this period included Presidency of the Philippine Coconut Authority through which he gained control of the copra industry together with Danding Cojuangco, and being the general put in charge of logging in the Philippines under martial law - a period during which lumber exports were so extensive that the forest cover of the Philippines shrank until only 8% remained. By the 1980s, however, rising factionalism in the Marcos administration led to a reduction in Enrile's influence within the administration.

Enrile and the Reform the Armed Forces Movement organized a plot to overthrow Marcos in February 1986, but they were discovered. Deciding to stage a last stand in Camp Aguinaldo, Enrile sought support from other units of the Armed Forces of the Philippines and received it from Philippine Constabulary General Fidel Ramos in nearby Camp Crame, who joined Enrile in withdrawing support for Marcos in February 1986. Marcos moved to put down the dissenters in Camps Aguinaldo and Crame, but civilians who were already preparing mass protests in response to electoral fraud during the 1986 Philippine presidential election went en masse to Epifanio de los Santos Avenue near Enrile and Ramos's forces, and prevented Marcos from assaulting the coup organizers. This mass movement of citizens to protect Enrile and Ramos was one of the key moments of the 1986 People Power Revolution which drove Marcos out of power and into exile. Enrile has continued to be a politician since 1986; he was the Senate President from November 2008 until his resignation on June 5, 2013. He remained a Senator until 2016, latterly as Minority Leader.

Early life and career
Enrile was born on February 14, 1924 in Gonzaga, Cagayan, to Petra Furagganan, the stepdaughter of a poor fisherman. He was born out of wedlock—his Spanish mestizo father was the powerful regional politician and renowned lawyer Alfonso Ponce Enrile, who was already married. His second great-uncle was Mariano Ponce. He was baptized into the Philippine Independent Church (Aglipayan) as Juanito Furagganan. He converted to Roman Catholicism at age 20. As a young man, he was reunited with his father in the City of Manila and took his secondary education at Saint James Academy in Malabon. His father took legal steps in changing his name to Juan Ponce Enrile, the name that he would use for his pre-law enrollment.

He graduated cum laude in 1949 with an Associate of Arts degree from Ateneo de Manila University. Afterward, he attended the University of the Philippines College of Law and graduated cum laude with a Bachelor of Laws degree. While in law school, he joined the Sigma Rho fraternity, the oldest law-based fraternity in Asia with other Senate colleagues such as Franklin Drilon and father and son duo Edgardo Angara and Sonny Angara among many others. Upon graduation, he was elected to the Pi Gamma Mu and Phi Kappa Phi international honor societies. He scored 11th in the 1953 bar examinations with a 91.72% rating and a perfect score in mercantile law. As a scholar at Harvard Law School, he earned a Master of Laws degree with specialized training in international tax law.

He taught law at the Far Eastern University and practiced law in his father's law firm before taking responsibility for then-Senator Ferdinand Marcos' personal legal affairs in 1964, especially during the latter's term as Senate President. After Marcos was elected president in 1965, Enrile became part of his inner circle.

Career in the Marcos Cabinet

Before Martial Law 
Enrile, like Marcos, comes from the northern Philippines, a region that had become Marcos' recruiting ground for key political and military leaders during his time. Enrile was with Marcos since his election in 1965. His campaign efforts were rewarded with an appointment as chief of the Bureau of Customs and the government's service insurance commission.

From 1966 to 1968, he was the Undersecretary and sometime Acting Secretary of the Department of Finance. He concurrently became acting Insurance Commissioner and Commissioner of the Bureau of Customs. From 1968 to 1970, he was the Secretary of Justice.

The Department of National Defense would expand its power when Marcos assumed the presidency in 1965. Marcos appointed Enrile as his Secretary of National Defense on February 9, 1970, a position Enrile held until August 27, 1971, when he resigned to run unsuccessfully for the senate. He was re-appointed Defense Secretary by Marcos on January 4, 1972. As Defense Secretary, he was the highest-ranked commissioned officer of a nation's armed forces.

Martial law

Preparations for the declaration of martial law 
From the beginning of Marcos' period in government, Enrile was one of the few that the former president trusted, and was seen by many as Marcos' protégé. For almost the entire period of Martial Law, Enrile served officially as the martial law administrator as he was in charge of all the armed forces' services during that time. Furthermore, as early as Marcos' planning and preparation for the declaration of martial law, Enrile was involved. In his memoir, Enrile recalls Marcos' careful preparations. He narrates that as early as December 1969, Marcos instructed him to study the 1935 Constitution, specifically the powers of the President as Commander-in-Chief. Marcos had already foreseen a rise in violence and chaos in the country and wanted to know the exact extent of his powers.

At the end of January of the following year, Enrile, with help from Efren Plana and Minerva Gonzaga Reyes, submitted the only copy of the report regarding the detailed nature and extent of Martial Law to Marcos. Soon after, Marcos allegedly ordered Enrile to prepare all documents necessary for the implementation of Martial Law in the Philippines. In August 1972, Marcos once again met with Enrile and a few of his other most trusted commanders to discuss tentative dates for the declaration. By September 22, 1972, Marcos announced that he had placed the entire country under Martial Law as of 9 p.m. via proclamation 1081 which, he claimed, he had signed on September 21, 1972.

Alleged September 22, 1972 ambush 

One of Marcos' justifications for the declaration of martial law that year was terrorism. He cited the alleged ambush attack on Enrile's white Mercedes-Benz sedan on September 22, 1972, as a pretext for martial law. At the time, many people doubted that the attack took place. Marcos, in his diary entry for September 1972, wrote that Enrile had been ambushed near Wack-Wack that night. He says "it was a good thing he was riding in his security car as a protective measure... This makes the martial law proclamation a necessity."

 
The doubts surrounding the alleged ambush were further confirmed in a press conference on February 23, 1986, when then Lieutenant General Fidel Ramos and Enrile admitted that the attack was staged to justify the declaration of martial law. Both radio and television media covered this and millions of Filipinos witnessed the said confession. Furthermore, in several interviews, Enrile was reported as indeed confirming that the attempted assassination was faked to justify the declaration of Martial Law. Conflicting accounts arise in his book, Juan Ponce Enrile: A Memoir. In the said book, Enrile accuses his political opponents of spreading rumors of the ambush being staged despite having already admitted several times that the attempted assassination was indeed fake.

Martial law administration role 
Despite the later controversy, at the time, Enrile remained one of Marcos' most loyal allies. In 1973, under the new modified parliamentary system then in place under the country's new constitution under Martial Law, Enrile's title became Defense Minister. Enrile focused his efforts on a broad review of defense policies and on dealing with pressing social unrest. The abolition of civilian institutions such as Congress, the weakening of the judiciary, and the outlawing of political parties, left the military as the only other instrumentality of the national government outside of the Presidency.

Role in logging, and in the Coconut Authority  

According to the National Historical Commission of the Philippines, Enrile was also appointed as the general for logging in the Philippines during martial law. He was tasked by Marcos to give certificates to logging companies, which eventually led to one of Asia's most devastating environmental disasters. During that time, the forest cover of the Philippines shrank until only 8% remained. Enrile also owned numerous logging companies such as Ameco in Bukidnon, Dolores Timber in Samar, San Jose Timber in Northern Samar, Kasilagan Softwood Development Corp in Butuan, Eurasia Match in Cebu, Pan Oriental which operates in Cebu and Butuan, Palawan-Apitong Corp in Palawan, and Royal Match. He also invested heavily in a rubber plantation in Basilan. A share of Marcos's ill-gotten wealth was siphoned into tintose companies.

Enrile was also appointed by Marcos as the President of the Philippine Coconut Authority, where he established control of the copra industry together with Danding Cojuangco. The two ruled over the controversial Coco Levy Fund which proved their intense corruption in government service. The fund, which was supposed to be used to improve the country's copra industry, was used by the two for programs led by Imelda Marcos and other Marcos cronies. A huge portion of the fund was also used for the presidential campaigns of Ferdinand Marcos in 1983.

Reduced influence 

With rising factionalism in the Marcos administration towards its latter years, Enrile's influence began to be reduced. On November 28, 1978, Marcos issued the Letter of Instruction no. 776, which stated that "No changes of assignment of senior officers including provincial commanders, brigade commanders, division commanders, and special unit commanders shall be made without clearance from the president." 

By the 1980s, Marcos began to more aggressively bypass Enrile's authority. He clipped the powers of the Minister of National Defense and the Chief of Staff over the Armed Forces of the Philippines. Enrile started to break away from the Marcos dictatorship. He began aligning himself with dissident elements in the army, particularly the Reform the Armed Forces Movement (RAM) - which was then headed by his aide-de-camp, Lieutenant Colonel Gregorio Honasan. In a 1986 press conference, Enrile is quoted as having said: As far back as 1982, we have been getting persistent reports that there were efforts to eliminate us . . . and it was [at] that point that we decided to organize a group to protect ourselves . . . now known as the AFP Reform Movement.

Role in aborted coup and the People Power Revolution 

Under pressure from the US Government, Marcos agreed to hold the 1986 Philippine presidential election on February 7, 1986. Despite widespread allegations of fraud, which included a protest walkout by-election tabulators, Marcos was proclaimed the winner against his opponent Corazon Aquino on February 15. Aquino protested and declared victory, launching a civil disobedience campaign at a massive rally in Luneta on February 16, 1986, and then going to Cebu to organize more mass protests.

Officers from the Reform the Armed Forces Movement, with Enrile's support, had been planning to launch a coup d'état against Marcos since 1985, which they delayed when Marcos announced the 1986 election. Enrile and the RAM decided to launch the coup against Marcos in February 1986 in order to take advantage of the political instability in the wake of the controversial election. However, this RAM coup d'état failed when it was discovered by Ver in the early morning hours of February 22, 1986 - a day before it was supposed to be implemented.

At two PM on February 22, 1986, Enrile asked for the support of then Lieutenant General Fidel Ramos, the head of the Philippine Constabulary and concurrent vice-chief of staff of the armed forces, who agreed to join Enrile. With the plot already uncovered by Marcos, Enrile decided to encamp at Aguinaldo in Quezon City, across the Epifanio de los Santos Avenue from Ramos' headquarters in Camp Crame. With their forces trapped in the two camps 5 PM on February 22, Enrile called Manila Archbishop Jaime Cardinal Sin, asking for support. Enrile is quoted as having told Cardinal Sin:"I will be dead within one hour. I don't want to die... If it is possible, do something. I'd still like to live."

Shortly after 10 PM a few hours later, Cardinal Sin went on the air through Radio Veritas to appeal to Filipinos in the area to support Enrile and Ramos by going to the section of Epifanio de Los Santos Avenue (EDSA) between the two camps, giving the rebels emotional support and supplies. Already prepared for protests linked to Aquino's civil disobedience campaign, People began gathering at EDSA, and this was the beginning of the citizens' revolt that became known as the People Power Revolution.

For the next three days, they continued their rally in EDSA now containing two million people in support. The growing number encouraged many more leaders to support the movement against Marcos. Enrile stated: "It was funny... We in the defense and military organizations who should be protecting the people were being protected by them."

Enrile wanted Corazon Aquino to hold her inauguration as new president in Camp Crame, but Aquino refused, emphasizing that the People Power Revolution was a civilian victory by the Filipino people, not by a rebel military faction. She held her inauguration on February 25, 1986, at the nearby Club Filipino instead, with Enrile and Ramos invited only as guests. The People Power Revolution forced Marcos out of power on February 25, 1986, and Marcos, along with his family, some servants, and millions of dollars in stocks, jewelry, and cash, flew to exile in Hawaii on US Government-provided DC-9 Medivac and C-141B planes.

Career in the Aquino Cabinet

Appointment and disagreements 
The quick development of events in the wake of the People Power Revolution prevented both Enrile's original plan of forming a ruling junta, and his backup plan of forming a coalition government with him and Corazon Aquino as co-equal partners. So he accepted Aquino as president, and accepted the post of Secretary of National Defense, believing that the politically and militarily inexperienced president would rely on him for advice. However, Aquino did not rely on Enrile's advice as much as he expected her to. 

Enrile publicly took up an anticommunist persona, organizing rallies to publicly decry Aquino's ceasefires and peace talks with the Communist Party of the Philippines. This led to confrontations with numerous members of Aquino's coalition cabinet, but eased tensions between Enrile and Marcos loyalists.

Enrile's relations with the rest of the administration further soured when the newly-created Presidential Commission on Good Government, led by Jovito Salonga, began a probe of Enrile's business transactions during the Marcos years.

Even though Marcos had been exiled, the Aquino administration continued to face challenges, particularly from forces loyal to Marcos, and from some members of the Reform the Armed Forces Movement which began to express dissatisfaction with her policies. This resulted in several Coup d'etat attempts from 1986 to 1990 which sought to oust Aquino from the presidency.  

Enrile and Ramos were tasked with addressing the first of these coups, which was the July 1986 Manila Hotel Incident in which loyalist soldiers and officials briefly took over the Manila Hotel and declared their own government.  The incident was resolved without violence and without much impact to the broader public, and the Aquino administration pursued a policy of maximum leniency towards the instigators.

Within Aquino's own "coalition cabinet," there was significant conflict, with Enrile and other rightwing cabinet members demanding that Aquino let go of cabinet members associated with the left, and to take a more hardline stance against the Communist Party of the Philippines and the left in general.

"God Save the Queen" plot 
Enrile was then implicated in the "God Save the Queen" plot that was to supposedly take place on November 11, 1986. The investigation of the coup done by the Fact-Finding Commission found Enrile and some members of the RAM as the primary instigators of the coup.

Forced resignation 
After revealing the fruits of the investigation findings, Aquino forced Enrile to resign as Defense Secretary in November 1986 as she had lost confidence in him. Enrile was then replaced with Rafael Ileto.

Congressional career

First Senate term

In May 1987, Enrile won a seat in the 1987 election as one of two opposition members in the country's 24-member Senate (the other being Joseph Estrada), finishing 24th. He was unable to be proclaimed until August when the electoral protest filed by Augusto Sanchez was dismissed. He formally assumed office on August 15, 1987. In the same month, an attempted coup against Aquino escalated and led to the destruction of the Armed Forces General Headquarters (AFPGHQ) in Camp Aguinaldo in Quezon City. He was detained in Camp Aguinaldo over suspicion of planning the coup with Lt. Col. Gregorio Honasan but was released days later for lack of evidence. Enrile later stated numerous recalls about the martial law era, of which all were flip-flops from his previous statements during his term as secretary of defense and during the ouster of Marcos. He was dubbed by then-President Corazon Aquino as "Pambansang Balimbing" (national political turncoat) for his contradicting statements and "Dakilang Miron" (great bystander) for his inconvenient bystander and opportunistic attitude.

Member of the House of Representatives
In 1992, before his term in the Senate had ended, Enrile predicted that he might lose the senatorial election or win, but only serve three years in office. Under the transitory provisions of the 1987 Constitution, the 12 candidates who receive the greatest number of votes serve a six-year term, the next 12 only three years. He ran instead for the House of Representatives of the Philippines. He was elected and represented the First District of Cagayan.

Second to fourth senate terms
In 1995 Enrile ran in the senatorial race as an independent candidate for senator and was also a guest candidate under the Lakas–Laban coalition. He won as a senator and held the position until 2001. During his term as senator, he ran as an independent candidate in the 1998 election for the position of President. He lost to then-Vice Joseph Estrada.

On January 13, 2001, he was one of those who voted against the opening of the second bank envelope. That vote led to the second EDSA People Power Revolution that eventually ousted President Estrada. From April 30 to May 1, 2001, together with Miriam Defensor Santiago, Gregorio Honasan, Panfilo Lacson and Vicente Sotto III, he led the EDSA III protests in support of Joseph Estrada. On May 1, 2001, the protesters stormed Malacañang Palace. In May 2001 he was indicted by the military for the investigation of the unsuccessful siege of Malacañan Palace by pro-Estrada forces but was released a day later. He ran for reelection as part of the Puwersa ng Masa coalition. Due to the issues that haunted him over the failed siege, he lost the election.

In the 2004 election, he made a comeback bid for the Senate under the Koalisyon ng Nagkakaisang Pilipino (KNP) banner. He actively opposed the imposition of the Purchased Power Adjustment (PPA) on consumers' electric bills. Due to his exposé of the PPA and the Supreme Court decision in favor of a refund on electric bills, the public responded positively and elected him. He thus became a senator in three non-consecutive terms. He was re-elected as a senator in the 2010 elections. At 86, he became the oldest senator of the 15th Congress of the Philippines. Enrile was affiliated with the opposition Pwersa ng Masang Pilipino (PMP) but officially stood as an independent and was part of the administration bloc.

Senate Presidency

Election
On November 17, 2008, Senate President Manuel Villar resigned due to a lack of support, and Enrile succeeded him the same day. Enrile was nominated by Panfilo Lacson; 14 senators supported the nomination and five abstained.

Legislation
Under his leadership, the Senate passed vital pieces of legislation such as the CARP Extension, Anti-Torture Act, Expanded Senior Citizens Act, Anti-Child Pornography Act, National Heritage Conservation Act, and Real Estate Investment Act, among many others. Institutional reforms were also implemented within the Senate to improve the daily conduct of business as well the welfare of its officers and employees.

Maguindanao martial law
The Senate also collaborated with the House of Representatives on two crucial issues which are now considered historical milestones. In December 2009, it used Proclamation No. 1959 of the previous administration, declaring a state of martial law and suspending the privilege of the writ of habeas corpus in the province of Maguindanao, while in May 2010, Congress convened to constitute itself as the national board to canvass the votes for president and vice president, and proclaim the winners.

Re-election as Senate President

Enrile was re-elected to a fourth term in the 2010 Senate election. On July 26, 2010, he was re-elected President of the Senate. Enrile committed himself to "discharge my duties and responsibilities with honor, with total devotion to our institution, and with fairness to all members. No partisan consideration will blur or color the treatment of any member of the Senate. We are all Senators elected by the people to serve them with the dedication to their interest and well-being and devotion to our responsibilities." Furthermore, in his acceptance speech, he enjoined his colleagues to "uphold the independence and integrity of this Senate, without abandoning our duty to cooperate with the other departments of the government to achieve what is good for our people."

Corona's impeachment, various feuds, and controversies
In early 2012, Enrile was the presiding officer of the impeachment of Chief Justice Renato Corona. He was one of the 20 Senators who voted guilty for the impeachment. In September 2012, he started a feud with Antonio Trillanes when he asked Trillanes why he secretly visited Beijing to talk about the Philippines and the Spratly Islands dispute on Spratlys and the Scarborough Shoal. Trillanes said that his visit to China was authorized by the Palace. He also alleged that Enrile was being pushed by former President Gloria Macapagal Arroyo to pass a bill splitting the province of Camarines Sur into two but Enrile denied the allegation.

In late 2012, Enrile also started a feud with Miriam Defensor Santiago when Santiago authored the Responsible Parenthood and Reproductive Health Act of 2012 with Pia Cayetano, which he opposed. In January 2013, Santiago alleged that Enrile gave PHP1.6 million each to his fellow Senators, except for her, Pia Cayetano, Alan Peter Cayetano, and Trillanes, who was reported to have been only given PHP250 thousand each. He admitted giving the said amount to the senators, saying that it was part of the balance of the maintenance and other operating expenses (MOOE) funds allowed per senator. On January 21, 2013, because of the controversies involving him, he attempted to vacate his position as Senate President but his motion was rejected.

Resignation
Amid accusations against him, including the alleged distribution of MOOE funds to senators, Enrile stepped down as Senate President after his privilege speech on June 5, 2013.

Post-Senate

Enrile quietly bowed out of politics after his term in the Senate ended in 2016, but tried to make a comeback in 2019. He placed 22nd in a field of 62 candidates. In 2022 he officially returned as government as Chief Presidential Legal Counsel in the administration of President Bongbong Marcos, whom he supported for president in elections that year. He played a role in forcing the resignation of Marcos' Executive Secretary Vic Rodriguez on September 17 by rejecting the latter's appointing of himself as Presidential Chief of Staff with extensive powers.

Controversies

Enrile cash gift
In January 2013, while sitting as the Senate President, Enrile was accused of using Senate funds called MOOE as Christmas gifts to members of the Senate who do not oppose him. This led to his resignation as Senate President without sufficiently answering the controversy.

Pork barrel scam

In September 2013, Enrile was again involved in misappropriated funds, this time about the PDAF or what is commonly called the pork barrel fund. Twenty billion pesos worth of Priority Development Fund was illegally channeled through various bogus NGOs of Janet Napoles most of it being used by the Senator.

Enrile, along with fellow senators Bong Revilla, and Jinggoy Estrada, were indicted for plunder and for the violation of the Anti-Graft and Corrupt Practices Act before the Sandiganbayan on June 6, 2014, in connection to the Priority Development Assistance Fund scam. Alleged mastermind Janet Lim Napoles and Enrile's former chief of staff Gigi Reyes were also charged. Enrile allegedly received ₱172 million in kickbacks from public funds. He was detained on July 3, 2014 and suspended from his Senate post on September 1, 2014, for these charges, after his motions to post bail to lift the suspension order were denied.

Personal life

Enrile, or "Manong Johnny" as he is often called (manong is an Ilocano term of endearment for an older brother), is married to Cristina Castañer (born in 1937) who has served as the Philippine Ambassador to the Holy See. They have two children: Juan Jr. (Jack) and Katrina. Juan Jr. is a former congressman for the 1st District of Cagayan who unsuccessfully ran for a Senate seat under UNA in 2013, while Katrina is currently CEO of Enrile's company Jaka Group, which owns the Philippine Match Company. Enrile has a half-sister, Armida Siguion-Reyna, who was a singer as well as a theatre and film actress.

Enrile's rumored affair with his former long-time employee and chief of staff Jessica Lucila "Gigi" Reyes, 38 years his junior, came out after reports that Enrile's wife, Cristina, walked out on him in January 1998 after charging him with adultery. The news made both local and international headlines. Gigi Reyes was regarded as "the door, if not the bridge" to Enrile, referring to the extent of closeness between the two. Enrile's special fondness for Reyes was again called out by Sen. Alan Peter Cayetano after Reyes accused Cayetano in a media interview of hypocrisy for supposedly receiving a "cash gift" from Enrile. The incident led to Reyes's resignation from Enrile's office, which Reyes said was also for her criticizing how Enrile responded to the issue of fund misuse. Enrile insisted the resignation was because of rumors of their illicit relationship. Reyes's name was once again linked to Enrile's name for signing documents that facilitated the release of Enrile's PDAF to fake non-governmental organizations (NGOs) linked to Janet Lim Napoles, the woman who is said to be behind the PDAF scam.

In 2007, Enrile's fraternity, Sigma Rho, was implicated in the death of a UP student who allegedly died during an initiation rite with the fraternity. As a result of the widely publicized backlash against Sigma Rho, Enrile labeled his fraternity brothers "Trainor of thugs and killers" and urged his "broads" to surrender those who were responsible for the death of Cris Mendez. "I am calling on them to initiate the effort to ferret out the people responsible and kick them out of the fraternity and if necessary kick them out of school", Enrile added.

Seeking clemency for those convicted of the Aquino assassination
On August 21, 2007, the 24th anniversary of Senator Aquino's death, Enrile stated that the case of the 14 soldiers incarcerated for 24 years for Aquino's assassination should be reviewed for clemency. Enrile paid for the legal services of the soldiers during their trial and said the soldiers and their families had suffered enough. They were initially acquitted in December 1985 by the Sandiganbayan's Manuel Pamaran, but after the proceedings were invalidated by the Supreme Court and the case retried, the Sandiganbayan's Regino C. Hermosisima Jr. convicted them on September 28, 1990. Fifteen soldiers of the Aviation Security Command had been sentenced to double life imprisonment for the double murder of Aquino and Rolando Galman, who was falsely accused of Aquino's assassination.

In popular culture
Portrayed by Joonee Gamboa in the 1988 TV drama film A Dangerous Life
Portrayed by Bugoy Cariño and Enrique Gil in a two-part special on the television drama anthology series Maalaala Mo Kaya, featuring his life story. Both part of the program's 21st season, the first part that was aired on April 27, 2013 is entitled Sapatos, while the second part that was aired on May 4, 2013 is entitled Diploma.
Having been one of the longest and oldest serving politicians in the Philippines, Enrile is often the subject of jokes and memes revolving around his longevity among Filipino humorists, with his alleged "immortality", supposed witnessing of prehistoric and biblical events, outliving domestic and international politicians and surviving disasters and health scares such as the COVID-19 pandemic being common themes.

References

External links
 Juan Ponce Enrile – Senate of the Philippines

|-

|-

1924 births
Living people
Ateneo de Manila University alumni
Bongbong Marcos administration cabinet members
Candidates in the 1998 Philippine presidential election
Commissioners of the Bureau of Customs of the Philippines
Converts to Roman Catholicism
Converts to Roman Catholicism from Catholic Independent denominations
Corazon Aquino administration cabinet members
20th-century Filipino lawyers
Filipino people of Spanish descent
Filipino Roman Catholics
Harvard Law School alumni
Ilocano people
Independent politicians in the Philippines
Kilusang Bagong Lipunan politicians
Ferdinand Marcos administration cabinet members
Members of the Batasang Pambansa
Members of the House of Representatives of the Philippines from Cagayan
Minority leaders of the Senate of the Philippines
Nacionalista Party politicians
Presidents of the Senate of the Philippines
Secretaries of Finance of the Philippines
Secretaries of Justice of the Philippines
Secretaries of National Defense of the Philippines
Senators of the 10th Congress of the Philippines
Senators of the 11th Congress of the Philippines
Senators of the 13th Congress of the Philippines
Senators of the 14th Congress of the Philippines
Senators of the 15th Congress of the Philippines
Senators of the 16th Congress of the Philippines
Senators of the 8th Congress of the Philippines
Filipino politicians convicted of crimes
People from Cagayan
People from Makati
People from Marikina
Filipino politicians convicted of corruption
People of the People Power Revolution
Pwersa ng Masang Pilipino politicians
United Nationalist Alliance politicians
University of the Philippines alumni